Tyczyn  is a town in southern Poland with a population of 3,353 inhabitants (02.06.2009).  It is located in the Rzeszów County of the Subcarpathian Voivodeship.

History 
Bartold Tyczner,  a merchant from Moravia, founded Tyczyn in 1368 during the reign of King Casimir III of Poland. The Jews migrated into the area during the 15th and 16th centuries.

Tyczyn is located in the lower Carpathian foothills, about halfway between the two large towns of Kraków to the west and Lviv (Lwów) to the east. The center of town is on top of a hill surrounded by numerous farming villages. To the north of town is the Strug River.

The town grew and dominated the area until the mid-17th century when it was destroyed first by a Tatar and later by a Cossack invasion. During the years 1792 to 1918 Tyczyn and the southern part of Poland, known as Polish Galicia, became part of the Austrian-Hungarian Empire.

Prior to World War II, Tyczyn had a vibrant Jewish shtetl community. The Nazi Army took control over the town on September 10, 1939. The Jewish residents faced severe restrictions, relocation from their homes to the Rzeszów ghetto, deportations to labor and concentration camps, as well as numerous executions. In particular, there is a large mass grave for the Jewish inhabitants who were executed in the forests in the outskirts of the town. George Lucius Salton, a former resident of Tyczyn, estimates that the Nazis reduced Jewish population from approximately 2,000 people to 10 people by end of the war. According to Salton's autobiography, most of the  ghetto's population, promised relocation to a large Ukrainian farm, were taken directly to Belzec where they were gassed in the designated gas chambers. Today, sites within the town serve as memorials and learning centers for the Tyczyn's victims of the Holocaust.

Education 
 Wyższa Szkoła Społeczno-Gospodarcza (Social-Economic High School)

See also

References
Notes

Cities and towns in Podkarpackie Voivodeship
Rzeszów County
Ruthenian Voivodeship
Kingdom of Galicia and Lodomeria
Lwów Voivodeship
Holocaust locations in Poland